Anthony Lausett Knapp (June 14, 1828 – May 24, 1881) was a U.S. Representative from Illinois, brother of Robert McCarty Knapp.

Born in Middletown, New York, Knapp moved with his parents to Illinois in 1839 and settled in the city of Jerseyville. He completed preparatory studies and then studied law. He was admitted to the bar and commenced practice in Jerseyville. He served as member of the Illinois Senate 1859-1861.

Knapp was elected as a Democrat to the Thirty-seventh Congress to fill the vacancy caused by the resignation of John A. McClernand. He was reelected to the Thirty-eighth Congress and served from December 12, 1861, to March 3, 1865. He was not a candidate for renomination in 1864. He moved to Chicago in 1865 and to Springfield, Illinois, in 1867 and continued the practice of law. He died in Springfield, Illinois, May 24, 1881. He was interred in Springfield Cemetery. He was reinterred in Oak Grove Cemetery in Jerseyville.

References

External links

 

1828 births
1881 deaths
Politicians from Springfield, Illinois
People from Jerseyville, Illinois
Democratic Party Illinois state senators
Illinois lawyers
Democratic Party members of the United States House of Representatives from Illinois
19th-century American politicians
People from Middletown, Orange County, New York
19th-century American lawyers